Million Dollar Listing Los Angeles (previously Million Dollar Listing) is an American reality television series that premiered on Bravo on August 29, 2006. The series chronicles the professional and personal lives of realtors in the real estate Industry based in Beverly Hills, Hollywood and Malibu as they sell high-end properties. It also gives viewers an inside look at the world of high-priced real estate in Los Angeles County.

The success of the series has resulted in three spin-offs; New York, Miami and San Francisco.

Current realtors
Main
 Josh Flagg, 2008—present
 Josh Altman, 2011—present
 Tracy Tutor, 2017—present

Production
The series was announced on July 15, 2005, as Million Dollar Listing: Hollywood. The title would later change to Million Dollar Listing and premiered on August 29, 2006. The first season encompasses two real estate agencies, one in Hollywood and one in Malibu. Numerous agents were featured during the season (including Madison Hildebrand, who appeared in later seasons). Episodes showcased real estate listings starting from the beginning of the selling process to close.

Season 2 premiered on August 5, 2008, almost two years after the prior season. The format of the program changed, focusing on specific agents as opposed to real estate companies. The season featured three Los Angeles real estate agents, Josh Flagg, Madison Hildebrand and Chad Rogers. Season 3 of Million Dollar Listing premiered on October 12, 2009 and  examines the falling real estate market and the three agents' tactics in staying afloat. The fourth season premiered on February 3, 2011 and featured agents Josh Flagg, Madison Hildebrand and a new agent, Josh Altman replacing Chad Rogers.

The show title was officially changed to Million Dollar Listing Los Angeles after the premiere of Million Dollar Listing New York, with the fifth-season premiere on June 6, 2012. Season 6 premiered on August 7, 2013 and averaged 1.3 million total viewers, compared to season five which averaged over 1 million total viewers. Season 7 premiered on August 20, 2014, with James Harris and David Parnes joining the cast and Hildebrand departing. Season 8 premiered on September 2, 2015. The ninth season premiered on October 6, 2016 with Madison Hildebrand returning as a full-time cast member. The tenth season premiered on November 2, 2017 with  Tracy Tutor Maltas joining the cast. In April 2018, the show was renewed for an eleventh season. Madison Hildebrand confirmed that he would not return for the eleventh season. The eleventh season premiered  on January 3, 2019.

On April 30, 2020, it was announced that the twelfth season will premiere on June 16, 2020. The entire season 11 cast returned while the season also featured an appearance by New York broker Fredrik Eklund.

On April 8, 2022 it was announced that there would be a fourteenth season with Fredrik Eklund, James Harris and David Parnes departing the series. The fourteenth season will begin airing on December 8th, 2022; featuring Flagg, Altman and Tutor.

Realtors
The current cast consists of Josh Flagg, Josh Altman and Tracy Tutor. Previously featured realtors include Carol Bird, Scotty Brown, Chase Campen, Chris Cortazzo, Madison Hildebrand, Shannon McLeod, Chad Rogers, Dia Schuldenfrei, Ray Schuldenfrei, Lydia Simon, James Harris, David Parnes and Fredrik Eklund.

Realtor timeline

Special seasons

Josh & Josh
After the premiere of the show's thirteenth season, Bravo announced a four-part limited series titled Million Dollar Listing Los Angeles: Josh & Josh, which features Josh Altman and Josh Flagg. The series chronicles the high-end properties sold by both Altman and Flagg outside of Los Angeles, including Napa, Aspen, and Newport Beach, whilst detailing the personal drama and moments in each other's lives. They are both joined by their respective loved ones, Heather Altman and Bobby Boyd.

Episodes

References

External links
 
 
 

2000s American reality television series
2010s American reality television series
2020s American reality television series
2006 American television series debuts
English-language television shows
Bravo (American TV network) original programming
Television shows filmed in Los Angeles
Television series by World of Wonder (company)